Max de Vaucorbeil (1901–1982) was a Belgian film director.

Selected filmography
 The Road to Paradise (1930)
 Captain Craddock (1932)
 Princess, At Your Orders! (1931)
 A Weak Woman (1933)
 Mademoiselle Béatrice (1943)
 The Marriage of Ramuntcho (1947)

References

Bibliography
 Goble, Alan. The Complete Index to Literary Sources in Film. Walter de Gruyter, 1999.

External links

1901 births
1982 deaths
Belgian film directors
Belgian emigrants to France
Mass media people from Brussels